Keith Gehling (born January 24, 1956) is a retired American soccer defender who played professionally in the Major Indoor Soccer League and the American Soccer League.

In 1973, Gehling played one season at the University of Washington.  In 1976, Gehling returned to college at Rockhurst College.  That season Rockhurst finished runner-up in the NAIA national men's soccer championship.  In 1977, Gehling was an NAIA All American.  In 2005, Rockhurst inducted Gehling into its Hall of Fame.  Following his graduation from Rockhurst, Gehling spent two years in sales.  In 1979, Gehling attended an open tryout for the expansion Wichita Wings of the Major Indoor Soccer League.  He won a contract and went on to spend three seasons with the Wings.  In addition to his indoor career with the Wings, Gehling spent four seasons in the American Soccer League with a different team each season (California Sunshine, New York Eagles, Rochester Flash and Oklahoma City Slickers).

External links
 Career stats
 Wichita Wings: Keith Gehling

References

Living people
1956 births
People from Granite City, Illinois
Soccer players from Illinois
American soccer players
American Soccer League (1933–1983) players
California Sunshine players
Major Indoor Soccer League (1978–1992) players
New York Eagles players
Oklahoma City Slickers (ASL) players
Rochester Flash players
Washington Huskies men's soccer players
Wichita Wings players
Association football defenders
Rockhurst Hawks
Rockhurst University alumni